Bigbang is a Norwegian rock band led by frontman Øystein Greni. Over the years, the band lineup has altered several times while remaining a trio, with Greni remaining the one constant member. The styling used for the band's name is inconsistent, variously using BigBang, BIGBANG or bigbang rather than Bigbang.

BigBang has been described as "Norway's best live band", with the recording Radio Radio TV Sleep holding the distinction of being the best selling live album ever to be released in Norway. The song lyrics are all in English.

History 
Øystein Greni grew up with a conviction that he was meant to create music, influenced not only by his own father's work, Thor S. Greni a performer in 1960—70s Norwegian language soul band Undertakers Circus and in 1968 an opening act for Led Zeppelin, but also by other 1960s and 70s artists such as Led Zeppelin, Jimi Hendrix and Curtis Mayfield. As a skateboarder he was influenced by punk rock music such as The Jam, Dinosaur Jr. and Hüsker Dü.

BigBang was formed in 1992 by Greni, Erik Tresselt and Christer Engen. The group went on a month-long tour of the U.S. in 1993, and released their first album Waxed in 1995 on the own independent record label, Grand Sport.

Drummer Christer Engen left the band to join Turbonegro in 1997, and was replaced by Martin Horntveth, previously with Jaga Jazzist. They released the single "How Do You Do", and remained together until January 1999 when Horntveth returned to Jaga Jazzist, to be replaced by Kristian Syvertsen. Syvertsen remained with the band until April of that year when he left and was replaced by Olaf Olsen. Bassist Tresselt left the band in August 1999 and was succeeded by Nikolai Eilertsen.

Greni sold his Vespa to pay the final installment to finance the production of Electric Psalmbook recorded during 1998 in Athletic Sound Studio in Halden, and released on the own label Grand Sport in March 1999. The band's breakthrough came about following a highly successful 1999 by:Larm concert in Stavanger, when suddenly several record companies demonstrated great interest in signing them. The band signed with Warner Music in 1999, and immediately re-released Electric Psalmbook in the fall of 1999.

For a period during 1999 as the song "Wild Bird" received considerable radio exposure and became established as a hit, BigBang as a group was temporarily dissolved. The BigBang song "Long Distance Man" is an English adaptation (with completely rewritten lyrics) of a Norwegian song by Undertakers Circus, "Nettenes Prinsesse" from 1973.

The album Clouds Rolling By from 2000 was the start of commercial success for BigBang, as the song "Girl In Oslo" became established as a hit and had been released in several compilation albums by that time. In early 2001, BigBang was Launched in Germany, Switzerland and Austria with the EP release Girl In Oslo.

Drummer Olaf Olsen was absent from the band from May 2000 until he returned in May 2001. During this time, drums were played by Karim Sayed. In March 2002, BigBang released Frontside Rock'n'Roll. The album features the song "Frontside Rock'n'Roll", which Øystein Greni dedicated to two skaters he knew that had died in their youth. The title refers to a skateboarding trick requiring a high level of proficiency. The release was followed by a U.S. tour spanning five weeks.

The live album Radio Radio TV Sleep was released in August 2003. A double CD with half acoustic material, the album's title refers to a cheatcode often found on Norwegian hotel room TV remote controls to access pay-television.
National network NRK taped a documentary over these live sessions, which climax is a performance of "Girl in Oslo" featuring five drummers, one of whom being Thor S. Greni.

In 2004 bassist Eilertsen departed from the band in order to focus on the group The National Bank, and former bassist Erik Tresselt returned to the band. With the April 2005 release of Poetic Terrorism, the band again utilised their own independent label Grand Sport in Norway, maintaining the role of Warner Music was for international and not domestic use.

Shortly after the release of the 2005 EP, Erik Tresselt left the band for the second time, and was replaced by Jarle Bernhoft, a former guitarist and vocalist of the Norwegian punk rock band Span. Bernhoft performed only one concert in Norway with the band. On the 2006 acoustic tour, former bassist and keyboardist Nikolai Eilertsen joined the band. During the concerts of this summer, Lasse Weeden played the bass.

Following their March 2007 album, Too Much Yang (2007), the band moved to Los Angeles, California in September 2007. Having employed several bassists during the year, Eilertsen did not wish to move to the U.S., and the role was filled by Lasse Weeden. The 2008 album From Acid to Zen was their American debut release, which received complementary reviews from among others David Fricke of Rolling Stones who selected the album as his "Fricke's Pick" and compared it to "a shotgun buffet".

As of 2009, the band released the seventh studio album Edendale, with Nikolai Eilertsen returning as bassist. In March 2011, BigBang released their eighth studio album, Epic Scrap Metal, . and on exactly the same date two years later, in March 2013, the trio released their so far newest album, The Oslo Bowl.

Members

Present
 Øystein Greni – guitar, bass, drums, percussion, vocals (1992–)
 Olaf Olsen – drums, percussion, backing vocals (1999–2000, 2001–)
 Nikolai Eilertsen – bass, keyboards, backing vocals (1999–2004, 2009–)

Past
Christer Engen – drums (1992–1997)
Martin Horntveth – drums (1997–1999)
Kristian Syvertsen – drums (1999)
Karim Sayed – drums (2000–2001)
Erik Tresselt – bass (1992–1999, 2004–2005)
Øyvind Storli Hoel – bass, backing vocals (2007–2008)
Lasse Weeden – bass (2007)

Timeline

Discography

Albums

Live albums

Compilation albums

EPs and singles

DVDs 

 Radio Radio TV Sleep - (Live footage + bonus material) (2003)

References

External links

BigBang official U.S. site

Norwegian indie rock groups
Norwegian rock music groups
Norwegian musical trios
Musical groups established in 1992
1992 establishments in Norway
Musical groups from Norway with local place of origin missing
Warner Music Group artists